The Fort Edmonton Footbridge is a pedestrian bridge that crosses the North Saskatchewan River in Edmonton, Alberta, Canada. Led by CH2M Hill and designed by HFKS Architects, it is the city's first suspension bridge. The bridge is located southwest of Fort Edmonton Park and connects to the existing multi-use trail system with the new park land on the west side of the river. It officially opened on June 18, 2011.

See also 
 List of crossings of the North Saskatchewan River

References

External links
 
 Fort Edmonton Footbridge Project page

Bridges in Edmonton
Bridges completed in 2010
Pedestrian bridges in Canada
Suspension bridges in Canada